= World Entrepreneurship Day =

World Entrepreneurship Day, also known as World Entrepreneurs' Day, is observed annually on 21 August to recognise entrepreneurship and promote innovation, enterprise and business leadership. The observance has been used by organisations and institutions in several countries, although it is not an official United Nations-designated international day. The International Labour Organization (ILO) marked World Entrepreneurs' Day on 21 August 2021, while government and educational institutions in countries including the United Kingdom, Jamaica and India have also observed the day.

The day is commonly marked through entrepreneurship talks, startup events, business competitions, mentoring programmes and activities aimed at encouraging aspiring entrepreneurs.
